Adrian Ilie (born 26 November 1981 in Iaşi) is a Romanian football player who plays for Bradul Borca. He plays as a central defender, but can also play as a defensive midfielder or as a left back.

Ilie started football in his home town, working his way up from the Politehnica Iaşi youth and before his transfer to Timișoara in winter 2006 he had only played for the Iași based team.

He did not manage to hold down a first team spot though and has been subsequently sent on loan.

References

1981 births
Living people
Sportspeople from Iași
Romanian footballers
Association football defenders
FC Politehnica Iași (1945) players
FC Politehnica Timișoara players
CSM Jiul Petroșani players
CS Știința Miroslava players
Liga I players
Liga II players